Sigismund Freiherr von Braun (14 April 1911 – 13 July 1998) was a German diplomat and Secretary of State in the Foreign Office (1970–1972).

Biography
Sigismund von Braun was born in Berlin-Zehlendorf in 1911, the eldest son of the East Prussian landowner and later Reich Food Minister Magnus von Braun (senior).  His brothers were rocket scientists Wernher von Braun and Magnus von Braun, and he was the father of politician Carola von Braun and cultural theorist Christina von Braun.

After an apprenticeship in 1934, Braun spent a year at the University of Cincinnati in the United States of America,  studying law on a scholarship from the German Academic Exchange Service. After this, he made a trip around the world, taking in Japan, China, Malaya, and India. In 1936, he became an attaché in the German Foreign Service. Until April 1937, he was the personal assistant of the German ambassador in Paris, but in September, due to a dispute with Baldur von Schirach he was reassigned to a new posting at Addis Ababa. On 1 October 1939, he joined the Nazi party. In 1943 he became Legation Secretary of the Embassy to the Holy See in Rome, where he remained until 1946. During denazification, Braun was classified as "discharged", despite his party membership, as he had "supported clerical and other offices in hiding people persecuted for religious, political and racial reasons and to obviate their deportation, taking high personal risk." After internment in Germany, he occasionally worked in the private sector, first as an assistant at several Nuremberg trials, then on the Wilhelmstrasse trial of Ernst von Weizsäcker, and finally as an employee of the state of Rhineland-Palatinate. 

In 1954, Braun entered the diplomatic service of the Federal Republic of Germany, and in 1956 joined the FDP. He was Chief of Protocol of the Foreign Office from 1962 to 1968, Permanent Representative at the United Nations in New York from 1968 to 1970, Secretary of State from 1970 to 1972, and then German Ambassador to France from 1972 to 1976.

Awards
 1962: Grand Gold Medal with Star for Services to the Republic of Austria

Publications
 France and Germany, in view of the European elections, held lectures at the invitation of East Prussia sheet and the Heads of State and Political Economy Society e V. Hamburg on 16 May 1979 in Hamburg / Sigismund Freiherr von Braun. - Hamburg: State and Society Political Economy, 1979. - 16 pages - (Small swg-series, H 17)
 Sigismund von Braun: Volatile Guests. On World Tour 1933–1935. Herchen + Hague, Frankfurt am Main 1993,

Literature
 Christina von Braun: Stille Post. Eine andere Familiengeschichte. Propylaea-Verlag, Berlin 2007,  (in German).
 Jobst Knigge: The Ambassador and the Pope. Weizsäcker and Pius XII. The German Embassy Vatican 1943–1945. Verlag Dr. Kovac, Hamburg 2008,  .
 Maria Keipert (ed.): Biographical Handbook of the German Foreign Service 1871–1945. Issued by the Foreign Office, Historical Service. Volume 1: John Hurter : A-F. Schöningh, Paderborn and others 2000,  .

External links
 Commons:Category:Sigismund von Braun  - collection of images, videos and audio files
 Scores by Sigismund von Braun in the catalog of the German National Library

References

1911 births
1998 deaths
Diplomats from Berlin
Wernher von Braun
Barons of Germany
Free Democratic Party (Germany) politicians
Ambassadors of West Germany to France
Permanent Representatives of West Germany to the United Nations
Nobility in the Nazi Party
People from Steglitz-Zehlendorf